is a Japanese dystopian punk rock musical / action film. Released in 1982, the film was directed by Gakuryū Ishii. Primarily a showcase for various specific punk rock bands of the time such as The Roosters, The Rockers, and The Stalin, the film is also purely demonstrative of the culture and attitude of the punk rock community of Japan in the mid-to-late 1970s and the early 1980s, and is considered a defining film of that subculture.

Plot 
The plot is not very complex, as much of the action and drama of the film relies on musical interludes, character interactions, and commentary on the class system in the film's fictional universe. What plot there is follows two different threads.

In the first thread, residents in a dystopia future attempt to rebel against the construction of a nuclear power plant in their part of Tokyo. They race cars, party, and brawl to the music of The Rockers and The Stalin. In the second, a small mute and his hard-core friend ride their bikes around the city, hunting down the person who murdered the mute's brother. The two are vigilantes.

The two threads combine when the bikers meet the power plant construction workers and discover that the oppressive businessman who runs the power plant is the same man which they have been searching for. The bikers, workers, and punks all band together to take on the businessman and his yakuza buddies. The "battle police" arrive, and everything erupts into violence.

Production 
Ishii created Burst City right in the middle of the punk movement in Japan, and many contemporary punk musicians took on leading acting roles in the film, as well as performing songs in the film. Ishii wanted to feature musicians from all three of the major punk hubs in Japan: The Stalin were from Tokyo, Machizo Machida was from Kansai, and The Roosters and the Rockers were from Kyushu. The cast and crew lived on the post-apocalyptic set that they built for the duration of the shoot.

To give the film a fresh, revolutionary feel, Ishii experimented with a lot of different techniques. The editing style is extremely fast and chaotic, and some scenes combine a mix of undercranked shots and regular speed shots with striking results. Musical numbers and scenes of performers getting ready backstage are shot in a documentary style. The backgrounds are populated with thousands of extras in eccentric costumes and hairstyles, all captured in grainy 16mm film.

Release 
The film was distributed by the Toei studio. It was later released on Region 1 DVD by Discotek in June 2006, and then on Blu-ray in January 2016 by Toei. It was released on Blu-Ray on Region 1 by Arrow Video in November 2020.

Reception 
The film is highly regarded among critics and audiences alike. Its hyperkinetic, unrelentingly high energy style was wildly different from other films of the period and extremely innovative. The film is also regarded for being purely inspired from music, and the way the punk aesthetic, culture, and music exerts its influence over every element, scene, and character in the film. It has been called one of the "starting points in contemporary Japanese cinema", along with Ishii's own Shuffle, Panic in High School, and Crazy Thunder Road.

It is debatable whether the cinematic innovations of yesterday translate to viewers today. Todd Brown of ScreenAnarchy argued that "while Burst City is clearly a watershed film, it stands up better as a cultural document than as a film, per se," but Simon Abrams wrote on RogerEbert.com that the director "perfectly captures his subjects' prickly, defiant attitude, making Burst City a defiant (and still-relevant) reaction to nuclear proliferation."

Soundtrack 

The Burst City original soundtrack was released by SEE SAW on March 5, 1982.

Releases

Tracklist

See also
 Cyberpunk
 Japanese cyberpunk
 Punk film

References

External links 
 
 

1982 films
Punk films
1980s musical films
1980s science fiction action films
1980s vigilante films
1980s Japanese-language films
Films directed by Sōgo Ishii
Japanese science fiction action films
Cyberpunk films
Discotek Media
Films about social class
Films set in the future
Films set in Tokyo
1980s dystopian films
Japanese films about revenge
Japanese vigilante films
Japanese musical films
Yakuza films
1980s Japanese films